The night sky refers to the sky as it is seen at night.

Night sky (or skies) may also refer to:

Night Sky (TV series), a 2022 science-fiction TV series on Amazon Prime Video
 Night Skies, a 1970s sci-fi horror film conceived by Steven Spielberg 
 Night Skies (2007 film), a 2007 horror film that revolves around the Phoenix Lights
 Night Sky (magazine), a 2004-2007 American magazine for entry-level stargazers published by Sky Publishing
 Night Sky Mine, a 1997 science fiction novel by Melissa Scott
 Night Sky Network, an educational effort sponsored by the National Aeronautics and Space Administration (NASA)
 Night Sky Replies, a 1994 mini album by the American musician Robert Rich
 Night Sky (play), a 1991 play by Susan Yankowitz
 NightSky, a 2011 video game

See also

 Sky at Night (disambiguation)
 
 Darkest Night (disambiguation)
 Longest Night (disambiguation)
 Night (disambiguation)
 Nights (disambiguation)
 Planetarium
 Sky (disambiguation)